Florian Berisha (born 18 January 1990) is a Swiss football player, who plays as an attacking midfielder for FC Martigny-Sports.

Career
On 15 February 2016, Berisha joined Servette FC on loan from Neuchâtel Xamax until the end of the season in 1. Liga Promotion. After the loan, he signed permanently with the club. On 15 February 2018, he was loaned out to Stade Nyonnais for the rest of the season, where he played 2 league games. He then returned to Servette FC, where his contract expired and he left the club.

Yverdon Sport announced on 7 January 2019 that they had signed Berisha for one year. Six months later, he moved to FC Martigny-Sports.

References

 Football Switzerland Profile
 

1990 births
Living people
Association football midfielders
Swiss men's footballers
Swiss people of Kosovan descent
Switzerland youth international footballers
FC Sion players
FC Schaffhausen players
FC Aarau players
FC Chiasso players
FC Le Mont players
Neuchâtel Xamax FCS players
Servette FC players
FC Stade Nyonnais players
Yverdon-Sport FC players
FC Martigny-Sports players
Swiss Super League players
Swiss Challenge League players
Swiss people of Albanian descent
Sportspeople from Lugano